EA Digital Illusions CE AB (trade name: DICE) is a Swedish video game developer based in Stockholm. The company was founded in 1992 and has been a subsidiary of Electronic Arts since 2006. Its releases include the Battlefield, Mirror's Edge and Star Wars: Battlefront series. Through their Frostbite Labs division, the company also develops the Frostbite game engine.

History

Foundation and early years (1992–2000) 
Digital Illusions was founded in May 1992 by Olof "Olle" Gustafsson, Markus Nyström, Fredrik Liljegren and Andreas Axelsson, four friends and former members of The Silents, a demogroup that developed for Amiga systems. The four studied at Växjö University, thus DICE was established in Växjö.

Expansion (2000–2004) 
In 2000, DICE acquired developer Refraction Games (developers of Codename Eagle). From the acquisition, DICE inherited the in-development Battlefield 1942. Patrick Söderlund, who had founded Refraction Games in 1997, subsequently joined DICE as chief executive officer. This was followed with the merger of Sandbox Studios in April 2001. Sandbox Studios added 50 employees to DICE's staff, amounting to 150 total employees. In September 2004, DICE also merged with Trauma Studios in New York City. Trauma Studios employed nine people at the time.

Acquisition by Electronic Arts (2006–present) 
At the time, EA owned 18.9% in DICE. Initially, the offer was rejected by shareholders representing 28% of DICE's ownership on 15 December, after which EA adjusted its offer on 20 December, intending to only purchase 44.5% at the same price per share, extending the offer deadline to 20 January 2005. On 25 January 2005, shareholders agreed to the acquisition, and EA raised their ownership in DICE to 59.8%.

Shortly following the acquisition, on 5 October, EA closed Digital Illusions Canada, DICE's Ontario-based studio. The 25 employees working at the studio at the time were given the option to transfer to DICE's headquarters in Stockholm or any other EA studio. DICE co-founder Liljegren announced on 16 October that he established RedJade as a successor to Digital Illusions Canada.

In May 2013, EA opened a new Los Angeles-based division for DICE known as DICE LA, helmed by former senior staff of EA's previously closed studio Danger Close Games. DICE LA had generally been involved with support of DICE and other EA games and had not generated any title on their own. Vince Zampella of Respawn Entertainment (another EA studio) was named as the studio's new lead in January 2020. Zampella had indicated at this time that they would likely become separate from DICE, and change their name to reflect this. DICE LA announced their new name, Ripple Effect Studios, in July 2021, but otherwise under management by Zampella, and while they will finish work on Battlefield 2042, will move in a new direction following its release.

On December 2, 2021, Electronic Arts announced that Vince Zampella, co-founder of Respawn Entertainment and head of Ripple Effect Studios, will oversee the Battlefield series going forward, with Ripple Effect leading the way in developing the franchise's "new experiences", instead of DICE. Along with the announcement, it was reported that DICE General Manager Oskar Gabrielson would be leaving EA, with Rebecka Coutaz, formerly Managing Director of Ubisoft Annecy, taking his place in the role.

Games developed

Notes 
 Co-developed with Easy Studios
 Co-developed with Neowiz Games
 Cancelled in 1994 but eventually revived by Strictly Limited Games and released in 2019

References

External links 
 
 

Battlefield (video game series)
Electronic Arts
Video game companies established in 1992
Video game companies of Sweden
Companies based in Stockholm
Video game development companies
2006 mergers and acquisitions
Swedish companies established in 1992